Kysor is a surname. Notable people with the surname include:

Charles H. Kysor (1883–1954), American architect
Ezra F. Kysor (1835–1907), American architect